Eastworld is a Japanese jazz and pop music record label owned by EMI Music Japan (former Toshiba-EMI), under Universal Music Group.

Artists
Minako Honda
Jennifer Connelly
Marvin Peterson
Original Love
RC Succession
Sadistic Mika Band
Sandii
The Willard
Yukihiro Takahashi
Hikaru Utada
George Cables
Boøwy
Patty (singer)
Tomoyasu Hotei
Complex
Koji Kikkawa

See also
 EMI Music Japan

Japanese record labels
Jazz record labels
EMI
Toshiba brands
Universal Music Japan
Labels distributed by Universal Music Group